The Hochschule für Gestaltung Schwäbisch Gmünd (HfG Schwäbisch Gmünd) is a university of design in the German State of Baden-Württemberg.

References

Design schools in Germany
Universities and colleges in Baden-Württemberg
Universities of Applied Sciences in Germany
1776 establishments in the Holy Roman Empire
Public universities and colleges in Germany
Educational institutions established in 1776